Jessica Moreira (born 16 November 2001) is a Brazilian athlete. She competed in the women's 400 metres hurdles event at the 2019 World Athletics Championships.

References

External links

2001 births
Living people
Brazilian female hurdlers
Place of birth missing (living people)
World Athletics Championships athletes for Brazil
21st-century Brazilian women